SGI Onyx2, code name Kego, is a family of visualization systems developed and manufactured by SGI, introduced in 1996 to succeed the Onyx. The Onyx2's basic system architecture is based on the Origin 2000 servers, but with the inclusion of graphics hardware. In 2000, the Onyx2 was succeeded by the Onyx 3000, and it was discontinued on June 27, 2003. These systems run either IRIX 6.4 or 6.5.

Models

Microprocessor 

The Onyx2 uses the MIPS R10000 microprocessor clocked at 150, 175, 180 and 195 MHz, later increased to 250 MHz, courtesy of a process shrink from 0.35 to 0.25 micrometers.
Later 300 and 400 MHz R12000, and 500 MHz R14000 CPUs were made available.

Graphics subsystem 
At the time of their introduction, the Onyx2 could be configured with the Reality, InfiniteReality, or InfiniteReality2 graphics subsystems. Later, the InfiniteReality2E was made available and then the InfiniteReality3, in April 2000.

References 
 SGI Onyx2 Reference data at Nekochan.net 

Onyx2